District 54 of the Oregon House of Representatives is one of 60 House legislative districts in the state of Oregon. As of 2013, the boundary for the district includes a portion of Deschutes County. The current representative for the district is Democrat Jason Kropf of Bend.

Election results
District boundaries have changed over time; therefore, representatives before 2013 may not represent the same constituency as today. General election results from 2000 to present are as follows:

See also
 Oregon Legislative Assembly
 Oregon House of Representatives

References

External links
 Oregon House of Representatives Official site
 Oregon Secretary of State: Redistricting Reform Task Force

Oregon House of Representatives districts
Deschutes County, Oregon